Juchitán may refer to:

Juchitán, Guerrero, Mexico
Juchitán, Oaxaca, Mexico ("Juchitán de Zaragoza")